Shurin may refer to:

People
Aaron Shurin (b. 1947), American writer
Dov Shurin (b. 1949), Israeli singer-songwriter
Susan Shurin, American doctor

Places
Shurin, Iran, a village in Hamadan Province, Iran
Shurin, Syria, a village in Aleppo Governorate, Syria

See also

Shurin College of Foreign Languages